Rawhide is an unincorporated community in Lee County, Virginia, United States. It is part of the Keokee census-designated place.

Rawhide was named by the family who owned the company store.

References

Unincorporated communities in Lee County, Virginia
Unincorporated communities in Virginia